Rollancourt is a commune in the Pas-de-Calais department in the Hauts-de-France region of France.

Geography
Rollancourt is located 18 miles (28 km) southeast of Montreuil-sur-Mer on the D107 road, in the valley of the Ternoise river.

Population

Places of interest
 The church of St.Riquier, dating from the fifteenth century.
 The Manoir de Courcelles, XIIth, XVIth and XVIIIth centuries
 A Louis XV château.
 Traces of an ancient château.

See also
Communes of the Pas-de-Calais department

References

Communes of Pas-de-Calais
Artois